Paisa (also transliterated as pice, pesa, poysha, poisha and baisa) is a monetary unit in several countries. The word is also a generalised idiom for money and wealth.  In India, Nepal, and Pakistan, the Paisa currently equals  of a Rupee. In Bangladesh, the Poysha equals  of a Bangladeshi Taka. In Oman, the Baisa equals  of an Omani Rial.

Etymology

The word paisa is from the Sanskrit term padāṁśa (basic unit), meaning 'quarter part base', from pada "foot or quarter or base" and aṁśa "part or unit". The pesa was also in use in colonial Kenya. The colloquial term for money in Burmese, paiksan, is derived from the Hindi term paisa.

History

Chaulukya coins were often called "Gadhaiya Paise" (9th-10th century CE).

Terminology

In Hindi, Bengali, Afghan Persian, Urdu, Nepali and other languages, the word paisa often means money or cash. Medieval trade routes that spanned the Arabian Sea between India, the Arab regions and East Africa spread the usage of Indian subcontinent and Arabic currency terms across these areas. The word pesa as a reference to money in East African languages such as Swahili dates from that period. An example of this usage is the older day Kenyan mobile-phone-based money transfer service M-Pesa (which stands for "mobile pesa" or "mobile money").

Usage
 Poysha =  of a Bangladeshi taka (no longer in circulation)
 Paisa =  of an Indian rupee  (only 50 paisa coins are de facto valid but no longer in circulation)
 Paisa =  of a Nepalese rupee  (no longer in circulation)
 Baisa =  of an Omani rial
 Paisa =  of a Pakistani rupee (Officially demonetized from 1 October 2014)

Gallery

See also

Bangladeshi taka
Indian paisa

References

External links 

Currencies of Asia
Currencies of Bangladesh
Coins of India
Coins of Pakistan
Economy of Nepal
Economy of Pakistan